The 2011–12 Arizona State Sun Devils men's basketball team represented Arizona State University during the 2011–12 NCAA Division I men's basketball season. The head coach was Herb Sendek who was in his sixth season with the team. The Sun Devils played their home games at the Wells Fargo Arena and are members of the Pac-12 Conference. They finished with a record of 10–21 overall and 6–12 in Pac-12 play. They lost in the first round of the 2012 Pac-12 men's basketball tournament to Stanford.

Roster

Schedule

|-
!colspan=9 style=|Exhibition

|-
!colspan=9 style=|Regular season

|-
!colspan=9 style=| Pac-12 tournament

References

Arizona State Sun Devils men's basketball seasons
Arizona State Sun Devils
Arizonia
Arizonia